Club de Fútbol Valdepeñas was a Spanish football team based in Valdepeñas, in the autonomous community of Castile-La Mancha. Founded in 1956, it was dissolved in 2004, and held home matches at Polideportivo Municipal La Molineta.

Season to season

3 seasons in Segunda División B
31 seasons in Tercera División

External links
BDFutbol team profile
ArefePedia profile 

Defunct football clubs in Castilla–La Mancha
Association football clubs established in 1956
Association football clubs disestablished in 2004
1956 establishments in Spain
2004 disestablishments in Spain
Province of Ciudad Real